Giuseppe Angelelli (Coimbra, Portugal, 7 December 1803 - Florence, 4 November 1844) was an Italian painter.

Biography
While born in Portugal, his parents were Italian. They traveled widely to Brazil (1807), Peru (1816), France, and England. Only in 1818 did Angelelli move to Florence to study in the Academy of Fine Arts of Florence under Pietro Benvenuti and Pietro Ermini. In 1827, he traveled to Egypt with a Franco-Tuscan expedition directed by the archeologists Ippolito Rosellini and Jean-François Champollion; where he made many drawings later engraved by in a book by Rosellini: I monumenti dell'Egitto e della Nubia, Atlante, 3 volumes, Pisa (1832, 1834, 1844). He also painted portraits.

 

Upon returning to Florence, the Grand Duke commissioned Angelelli to paint the members of the Franco-Tuscan expedition to the ruins of Thebes. Angelelli also painted African landscapes and made portraits, including that of his wife and self-portraits.

References

1803 births
1899 deaths
19th-century Italian painters
Italian male painters
Painters from Florence
Orientalist painters
Accademia di Belle Arti di Firenze alumni
People from Coimbra
19th-century Italian male artists